In the King's Service is a 2003 historical fantasy novel by Katherine Kurtz.

In the King's Service may also refer to:
 In the King's Service, a romance novel by Margaret Moore
 In the King's Service, a 1915 film directed by Tom Santschi

See also 
 The excuse of the King's service or essoin de servico regis, historical concept in English Law